Mohd Faiz bin Subri (born 8 November 1987) is a Malaysian professional footballer who plays as an attacking midfielder or forward for Malaysia Super League side Penang. He is best known for his banana free-kick goal which won him the 2016 FIFA Puskás Award.

Early life 
Faiz was born and raised in Ayer Hitam, Kedah. He is the third of five siblings. He received his primary and secondary education in Kedah, at Sekolah Kebangsaan Tengku Laksamana and Sekolah Menengah Kebangsaan Permatang Bonglai respectively, before transferring to Sekolah Menengah Teknik Arau in Perlis.

Club career

Kedah, Tambun Tulang, Perlis, T–Team 
Faiz began his football career playing for the Kedah youth team in 2006. In 2009, Faiz signed with FAM League club Tambun Tulang. He made 14 league appearances and 6 league goals during his season with the club. Tambun Tulang also Perlis in Piala Emas Raja-Raja 2009.

In 2010, Faiz signed with Malaysia Super League side Perlis. He played for two seasons with Perlis before decided to leave the club for T–Team and signed one-year contract with T–Team.

Kelantan, Terengganu 
In 2013, Faiz signed one-year contract with Kelantan FA along with his former teammate Zairo Anuar, where he score one goal against a Vietnamese football club, SHB Đà Nẵng in the AFC Cup group stage match. Faiz successfully made 28 appearances and 5 goals for Kelantan before his departure at the end of the 2013 season.

In 2014, Faiz signed a one-year contract with Terengganu FA. He managed to make 14 appearances and 1 goal during his season with Terengganu FA.

Penang 
After cutting short his stay with Terengganu FA, Faiz signed a contract with Penang FA along with his Terengganu FA teammate Mazlizam Mohamad. He helped Penang FA  earn second place in the 2015 Malaysia Premier League, and the team was consequently promoted to the 2016 Malaysia Super League.

On 16 February 2016, Faiz scored an incredible free kick in a 4–1 win over Pahang FA at the City Stadium in George Town. Videos of his free kick soon went viral on social media, and he was nominated by the Football Association of Malaysia for the FIFA Puskás Award later that year.

In 2017, Faiz was awarded the FIFA Puskás Award for that free kick goal, becoming the first-ever Asian to have won the international award for the best goal of the year.

Kuala Kangsar 
In March 2021, Faiz joined Kuala Kangsar FC.

Second spell with Penang 
In 2022, he return back to played for Penang for the second time.

International career 
Faiz was first called up to the Malaysia national team in 2012 and 2013 under K. Rajagopal, but he never made any appearance in either call-ups. After strong performance in 2015 with his team Penang, he was recalled to the national team in August 2015 under coach Dollah Salleh.

Style of play 
An efficient attacking midfielder, Faiz also can play as a winger and as a striker. His assets include his speed, precise long range shooting and his range of passing towards his teammates. Faiz is also notable for scoring spectacular free kicks.

FIFA Puskás Award 2016 
On 16 February 2016, during the 2016 Malaysia Super League match between Penang and Pahang at the City Stadium in George Town, Penang, Faiz scored an incredible free kick which subsequently went viral on social media for its 'physics-defying flight'. The free kick he took was described as a swerve so wicked that the goalkeeper... stood no chance'''.

The free kick goal he scored was nominated for the FIFA Puskás Award later that year by the Football Association of Malaysia. The nomination was accepted by FIFA, and Faiz subsequently made it all the way to FIFA's top 3 shortlist for the Puskás Award, beating the likes of professional stars such as Lionel Messi and Neymar.

On 9 January 2017, Faiz was awarded the FIFA Puskás Award during The Best FIFA Football Awards in Zurich, Switzerland. He garnered nearly 60% of the online votes, while Brazilian Marlone and Venezuelan Daniuska Rodriguez came in second and third places respectively. He is also the first Asian footballer to win the FIFA Puskás Award. Faiz Subri becomes the eighth player to collect this award after Cristiano Ronaldo (2009), Hamit Altintop (2010), Neymar (2011), Miroslav Stoch (2012), Zlatan Ibrahimović (2013), James Rodríguez (2014) and Wendell Lira (2015).

 Career statistics 
 Club 

 Honours Kelantan Malaysia FA Cup: 2013
 Malaysia Cup: Runners-up 2013Penang Malaysia Premier League: Promotion 2015Individual'''
 FIFA Puskás Award: 2016
 PFAM Player of the Month: February 2016
 FAM Football Awards – FAM Special Award: 2016 – Penang

References

External links 
 

1987 births
Living people
Malaysian footballers
Malaysia Super League players
Perlis FA players
Terengganu F.C. II players
KSK Tambun Tulang FC players
Kelantan FA players
Terengganu FC players
Penang F.C. players
People from Kedah
Malaysian people of Malay descent
Association football wingers
Association football forwards